Allanblackia gabonensis is a species of flowering plant in the family Clusiaceae. It is found in Cameroon and Gabon. Its natural habitat is subtropical or tropical moist lowland forest. It is threatened by habitat loss.

References

gabonensis
Flora of Cameroon
Flora of Gabon
Vulnerable plants
Taxonomy articles created by Polbot
Plants described in 1959